Predee Daochai (born 9 September 1958) is a Thai financial lawyer and executive. He served as Minister of Finance for 26 days in the second cabinet of Prime Minister Prayut Chan-o-cha.

Early life and education 
Predee graduated with a bachelor's degree in Laws (2nd Class Honors) from Thammasat University, Barrister-at-law of the Thai Bar Association, and Master of Comparative Law from University of Illinois at Urbana–Champaign, USA.

Careers 
Predee started his career at the Law Office of Kasikornbank in 1982 and was appointed as the Managing Director of Kasikornbank in 2013. He has been appointed as a member of the government of Prayut Chan-o-cha in several sets such as members of the Special Economic Development Zone Policy Committee Chairman, The Thai Bankers' Association, the Board of Investment. He was a member of the National Legislative Assembly in 2014.

In September 2020, he resigned from Finance Minister after a reported conflict with his deputy, Santi Promphat, although health reasons were also cited for his resignation.

Royal decorations 
  Knight Grand Cordon (First Class) of the Most Exalted Order of the White Elephant
  Knight Grand Cordon (2nd Class) of The Most Noble Order of the Crown of Thailand

References 

Living people
1958 births
Predee Daochai
Predee Daochai
Predee Daochai
University of Illinois Urbana-Champaign alumni
Predee Daochai
Predee Daochai
Predee Daochai
Predee Daochai